Ulmus 'Morton Red Tip' (selling name ) is a hybrid cultivar raised by the Morton Arboretum from an open pollination of Ulmus 'Morton'.
Tested in the US National Elm Trial coordinated by Colorado State University,  averaged a survival rate of 77.5% after 10 years.

Description
 has a graceful, vase-shaped habit resembling the American Elm Ulmus americana with foliage tinged red on emergence.

Pests and diseases
Although resistant to Dutch elm disease in the US,  is very susceptible to the elm leaf beetle Xanthogaleruca luteola, Japanese Beetle, and Gypsy moth; it is also moderately preferred by cankerworms.

Cultivation
 is very cold hardy; in artificial freezing tests at the arboretum the LT50 (temp. at which 50% of tissues die) was found to be −31 °C. However, the tree is notorious for its stem breakage owing to narrow crotch angles and included bark; in trials at the University of Minnesota it had the unhappy distinction of being the worst of 17 cultivars for breakage. The tree is currently being evaluated in the National Elm Trial coordinated by Colorado State University.

 is being promoted by the Chicagoland Grows corporation but is not widely available in the United States. Very rare in Europe, it is not known (2016) to have been introduced to Australasia.

Etymology

Accessions
North America
Brenton Arboretum, US. No details available.
Chicago Botanic Garden, US. 2 trees. No acc. details available.
Dawes Arboretum , US. 2 trees. No acc. details available.
Morton Arboretum, US. Acc. no. 60–2003.
University of Idaho Arboretum, US. Acc. no. 1998012
Europe
Grange Farm Arboretum, UK. Acc. no. 1140.

Nurseries
North America
Johnson's Nursery , Menomonee Falls, Wisconsin, US.
Sun Valley Garden Centre , Eden Prairie, Minnesota, US.

References

External links
 Warren, K., J. Frank Schmidt & Son Co. (2002).  The Status of Elms in the Nursery Industry in 2000. 
Miller, F. (2002). New elms for the landscape and urban forest.

Hybrid elm cultivar
Ulmus articles with images
Ulmus